Henrique Chagas Moniz de Aragão Gonzaga (born April 30, 1993), known professionally as Henrique Zaga, is a Brazilian actor.

Career
Henrique Zaga gained recognition early in his career, when he was cast as Josh Diaz in the MTV series Teen Wolf. Gonzaga later appeared in the Netflix film XOXO, and the series 13 Reasons Why.

In April 2017, he was cast as Marvel superhero Roberto da Costa / Sunspot in the 20th Century Fox X-Men spin-off film, The New Mutants.

On November 12, 2021 it was announced that Henrique Zaga will play Gabriel in a new Netflix movie titled: Beyond the Universe, the film will be released on October 27, 2022.

Filmography

Film

Television

Music videos

References

External links
 

1993 births
21st-century Brazilian male actors
Brazilian emigrants to the United States
Brazilian male film actors
Brazilian male television actors
Brazilian people of indigenous peoples descent
Brazilian people of Italian descent
Brazilian people of Portuguese descent
Brazilian people of Spanish descent
Living people
Male actors from Brasília